Duivenbode's six-wired bird-of-paradise, also known as Duivenbode's six-plumed bird-of-paradise, is a bird in the family Paradisaeidae that is an intergeneric hybrid between a western parotia and greater lophorina. The common name commemorates Maarten Dirk van Renesse van Duivenbode (1804–1878), Dutch trader of naturalia on Ternate.

History
Two adult male specimens are known of this hybrid, coming from the Geelvink Bay region of north-western New Guinea, and held in the American Museum of Natural History and the French Natural History Museum.

Notes

References
 
 

Hybrid birds of paradise
Birds of New Guinea
Intergeneric hybrids